James Aubrey may refer to:

 James Aubrey (actor) (1947–2010), English actor
 James T. Aubrey (1918–1994), American television and film executive
 Jimmy Aubrey (1887–1983), English actor
 James Aubrey (Bones), a fictional character